Krasny Voskhod is a rural locality (a settlement) in Beryozovskoye Rural Settlement, Podgorensky District, Voronezh Oblast, Russia. The population was 783 as of 2010. There are 7 streets.

Geography 
Krasny Voskhod is located 29 km north of Podgorensky (the district's administrative centre) by road. Saguny is the nearest rural locality.

References 

Rural localities in Podgorensky District